Kayode Bankole is a Nigerian footballer who plays as a goalkeeper for Nigeria Professional football league team Remo Stars. He began his senior career with Remo Stars in 2020.

Career statistics

International

References

2002 births
Living people
Nigerian footballers
Association football goalkeepers
Remo Stars F.C. players